Hildegard Damerius (born 29 January 1910 in Duisburg; died 3 May 2006 in Berlin) was a German lawyer and politician of the Socialist Unity Party of Germany (SED) in the German Democratic Republic (GDR). Until 1934, she studied law at the Universities of Leipzig, Heidelberg and Marburg and received her doctorate in 1938, after a legal clerkship in the Saxon Ministry of Justice. As an employee of the  Public Prosecutor General of the Federal Court of Justice, she was involved in the Waldheim trials.

References

1910 births
2006 deaths
Socialist Unity Party of Germany politicians
Leipzig University alumni
Jurists from North Rhine-Westphalia
German prosecutors